Ozyorsky Urban Okrug is the name of several municipal formations in Russia. The following administrative divisions are incorporated as such:
Town of Ozyorsk, Chelyabinsk Oblast
Ozyorsky District, Kaliningrad Oblast

See also
Ozyorsky (disambiguation)

References